Ruthin is a market town and community in Denbighshire, Wales, in the south of the Vale of Clwyd. It is Denbighshire's county town. The town, castle and St Peter's Square lie on a hill, skirted by villages such as Pwllglas and Rhewl. The name comes from the Welsh rhudd (red) and din (fort), after the colour of sandstone bedrock, from which the castle was built in 1277–1284. The Old Mill, Ruthin, is nearby. Maen Huail, a registered ancient monument attributed to the brother of Gildas and King Arthur, stands in St Peter's Square.

Demographics
The population at the 2001 census was 5,218, of whom 47 per cent were male and 53 per cent female. The average age was 43.0 years and 98.2 per cent were white. According to the 2011 census, the population had risen to 5,461. 68 per cent of which were born in Wales and 25 per cent in England. Welsh speakers account for 42 per cent of the town's population. The community includes the village of Llanfwrog.

History

There is evidence of Celtic and later Roman settlements in the area. However, little is known of the history of the town before the construction of Ruthin Castle was started in 1277 by Dafydd, the brother of prince Llywelyn ap Gruffudd. However, he forfeited the castle when he rebelled against King Edward I with his brother; Edward's queen, Eleanor, was in residence in 1281. The original name was Castell Coch yng Ngwern-fôr (Red Castle in the Sea Swamps). The Marcher Lord, Reginald de Grey, Justiciar of Chester, was given the Cantref (an administrative district) of Deffrencloyt (Dyffryn Clwyd, the Welsh for Vale of Clwyd), and his family ran the area for the next 226 years. The third Baron de Grey's land dispute with Owain Glyndŵr triggered Glyndŵr's rebellion against King Henry IV, which began on 16 September 1400, when Glyndŵr burned Ruthin to the ground, reputedly leaving only the castle and a few other buildings standing.

The Lord de Grey established a Collegiate Church in 1310. Now the Collegiate and Parish Church of St Peter, it dominates the Ruthin skyline. It has a double nave and boasts two medieval carved roofs. These days it is known for its musical tradition. It has a large choir of children and adults and a four-manual Wadsworth-Willis organ. Behind the church can be seen the old college buildings, school and Christ's Hospital.

A Ruthin native, Sir Thomas Exmewe was Lord Mayor of the City of London in 1517–1518.

The half-timbered Old Court House (built in 1401), on the square, features the remains of a gibbet last used to execute a Franciscan priest, Charles Meehan, also known as Mahoney. He was shipwrecked on the Welsh coast at a time when Catholicism was equated with treason – Meehan was hanged, drawn, and quartered in 1679. He was beatified by Pope John Paul II in 1987 as one of the Eighty-five martyrs of England and Wales.

During the English Civil War, the castle survived an eleven-week siege, after which it was demolished by order of Parliament. It was rebuilt in the 19th century as a country house, which has now been turned into the Ruthin Castle Hotel. From 1826 until 1921 the castle was the home of the Cornwallis-West family, members of Victorian and Edwardian high society.

In its 18th-century heyday as a town on drovers' routes from Wales into England, Ruthin was reputed to have "a pub for every week of the year". By 2007, however, there were only eleven pubs in the town. The public records of 23 October 1891 show 31 such establishments serving a population of 3,186; most have been converted into housing or shops. The Ruthin Union Workhouse was built in 1834.

The first copies of the Welsh national anthem, Hen Wlad Fy Nhadau, were printed in what is now the Siop Nain tea and gift shop on Well Street.

In 1863 the Denbigh, Ruthin and Corwen Railway, which linked in Denbigh with the Vale of Clwyd Railway (later part of the London and North Western Railway, the London, Midland and Scottish Railway, and British Rail) reached the town. The route ran from Rhyl along the north coast through Denbigh and Ruthin to Corwen, before joining a route from Ruabon through Llangollen, Corwen and Bala to Barmouth. The railway and Ruthin railway station closed in 1963 under the Beeching Axe. The site of the station is now occupied by a large road roundabout (Brieg Roundabout) and the Ruthin Craft Centre, which opened in 1982, but was rebuilt and reopened in 2008.

Ruthin hosted the National Eisteddfod in 1868 and 1973. The Urdd National Eisteddfod visited Ruthin in 1992 and 2006.

Education
The town's principal school is Ysgol Brynhyfryd (Brynhyfryd School), a comprehensive school for 11 to 18 year olds. Its Grade II listed building was built about 1830 as the home of local solicitor, before becoming in 1898 Ruthin County School for Girls. (The town's boys travelled five miles by train to Denbigh High School.) The school went co-educational in 1938, with feeder junior schools up to around six miles away. Building work in the 1950s and the early 1970s increased the number of pupils from 700 to 1000 in a few years, as the minimum school-leaving age rose from 15 to 16). In 2001–2002 the listed building became the Sixth Form Centre. The school's sports facilities, including the swimming pool, are used as the town's Leisure Centre. It also features a theatre and arts complex, Theatr John Ambrose, named after a headmaster of the school in the 1980s and 1990s. This was opened by the actor Rhys Ifans, a former pupil of Ysgol Pentrecelyn and Ysgol Maes Garmon in Mold, but brought up in Ruthin.

In 1574 Dr Gabriel Goodman re-founded Ruthin School which was founded in 1284, making it one of the oldest private schools in the United Kingdom. In 1590, Goodman established Christ's Hospital for 12 poor persons around St Peter's Church on the square, and was Dean of Westminster for 40 years (1561–1601). Ruthin School is now a co-educational boarding and day school, with 227 pupils overall, 145 of them boarders in 2014. In September 2013, the school bought Ye Old Anchor, after its closure as a hotel in November 2012, and converted it into a boarding house for 30 upper sixth-form students.

Transport

Bus
Ruthin has daytime bus services on Mondays to Saturdays, with the last bus on most routes leaving between 5.30 and 7.30 pm. There is no service on Sundays or public holidays. Routes serving Ruthin are Stagecoach 1 and 2 to Mold (1 via Llanarmon and Llanferres, 2 via Llanarmon, Graianrhyd, and Erryrys), X1 runs three times a day to Chester via Llanferres and Mold – frequency of the buses to Mold varies throughout the day between 30 minutes and 2 hours. Route X51 by Arriva runs basically hourly between Rhyl, St Asaph, Denbigh, Ruthin, and Wrexham (Rhyl bus station is next to the railway station, providing Ruthin's most convenient access to the national rail network, while Wrexham railway station is a short distance from its bus station.) Route 55, by Llew Jones Coaches, operates to Corwen at intervals of 50–135 minutes through the day, with three buses extended to Llangollen, and two of these via Llangollen to Wrexham. Route 76, by M & H Coaches, runs six times a day between Denbigh and Ruthin via Llandyrnog, Llangynhafal, and Llanbedr DC; two of these also serve Llanfair DC, Graigfechan, and Pentrecelyn. Less regular services include a weekly route 71 on Fridays between Corwen, Cerrigydrudion, Ruthin, and Morrisons' supermarket in Denbigh, and route 72 on Mondays, Wednesdays, and Fridays for Cyffylliog, Clocaenog, Bontuchel, Betws Gwerfil Goch, Melin-y-Wig, Derwen, and Clawddnewydd. Ruthin town has route 73, operating three buses a day around Ruthin on Mondays, Wednesdays and Fridays.

Rail

The Ruthin railway line and station closed in the 1960s.

In 1858, it was intended to extend the Vale of Clwyd line from Denbigh to Ruthin, running alongside the race-course in the town park (now Parc-y Dre housing) to the Station Hotel. However the West family prevented the line crossing the Castle Park towards Corwen. The route was diverted to the north alongside the road to Wrexham and the Station Hotel renamed the Park Place Hotel. Opposite Station Road lies Railway Terrace, a row of Grade II listed buildings, built in 1864 with evidence of trains running in a cutting in front. The first sod was cut in September 1860 by Mrs Florence West, with an inaugural service starting on St David's Day 1862. To mark this, a song was composed with words by T. Ab Gwilym, music by B. Williams and published by Isaac Clarke.

Sport
The local football club is Ruthin Town. In rugby union, Clwb Rygbi Rhuthun/Ruthin RFC has several teams: 1st XV, 2nd XV, 3rd XV, Youth, Juniors & Women's XV.

On 13 June 1981, Ruthin hosted the Annual General Meeting of the International Football Association Board, the body which determines the laws of football.

Facilities at Ruthin Leisure Centre on Mold Road include a swimming pool, sports hall and fitness suite. Llanfwrog Community Centre on Mwrog Street provides tennis courts, a golf driving range and bowling greens.

Tourism

Ruthin Gaol

The first House of Correction, or Bridewell, was built at the bottom of Clwyd Street, next to the river, in 1654, to replace the Old Court House, where able-bodied idlers and the unemployed were sent to work. Following John Howard's investigations into prison conditions the Denbighshire justices resolved to build a new model prison in Ruthin on the site of the old Bridewell. Work began in January 1775. In 1802 the prison had four cells for prisoners and nine rooms for debtors. By 1837 it could hold 37 inmates. The Prisons Act of 1865 set new standards for the design of prisons – as the Ruthin County Gaol did not meet the standards, plans were drawn up for a new four-storey wing. The new prison for up to 100 prisoners was built in the style of London's Pentonville Prison at a cost of £12,000. On 1 April 1878 the Ruthin County Gaol became HM Prison Ruthin, covering the counties of Denbighshire, Flintshire, and Merionethshire. As far as is known, only one person was ever executed in the prison: William Hughes of Denbigh, aged 42, who was hanged on 17 February 1903 for the murder of his wife, his plea of insanity having failed. Another prison personality was John Jones, known as Coch Bach y Bala – who was a kleptomaniac and poacher who had spent more than half his 60 years in all the prisons of north Wales and many in England; he twice escaped from Ruthin Gaol, first on 30 November 1879 when he walked out of prison with three others while the staff were having supper – a £5 reward was offered for his capture, which happened on the following 3 January. On 30 September 1913 he tunnelled out of his cell and using a rope made out of his bedding he climbed over the roof of the chapel and kitchen and got over the wall; after seven days living rough on the Nantclwyd Estate several miles away, Jones was shot in the leg by one of his pursuers, 19-year-old Reginald Jones-Bateman. Jones died of shock and blood loss, while Jones-Bateman was charged with manslaughter, though the charges were subsequently dropped.

Ruthin Gaol ceased to be a prison in 1916, when the prisoners and guards were transferred to Shrewsbury. The County Council bought the buildings in 1926 and used them for offices, the county archives and the town library. During the Second World War they were used as a munitions factory. They were then returned to the County Council and became the headquarters of the Denbighshire Library Service. In 2004 the Gaol was renovated and reopened as a museum.

Most Haunted: Midsummer Murders filmed the series' fifth episode in Ruthin, where the team investigated a Victorian Era murder. Locations included the Old Gaol and the town library.

The Craft Centre

The Craft Centre had ten studios occupied by crafters who could be watched while they worked at glass blowing, ceramic manufacture, painting, furniture restoration, etc. The original Craft Centre was demolished early in 2007, and a new Craft Centre opened in July 2008 in a £4.3 million scheme, which contains six craft workshops, larger galleries and an expanded craft retail gallery, two residency studios, an education space and a tourist information centre, and a restaurant.

Nantclwyd y Dre

Nantclwyd y Dre (previously known as Tŷ Nantclwyd), in Castle Street, was built about 1435 by a local merchant Gronw ap Madoc. The building was sold to the county council in 1982, restored from 2004, and opened to the public in 2007. It contains seven rooms which have been restored to represent various periods in the building's history. Visitors can also observe a colony of Lesser horseshoe bats in the attic rooms.

Behind the house are two gardens, the 13th-century inner garden and the outer Lord's Garden, itself believed to have been part of a 13th-century developed castle garden. Restored in the 18th century, Lord's Garden is now itself Grade II listed. In December 2013, the council successfully applied for a grant of £177,600 from the Heritage Lottery Fund, which will see Lord's Garden restored and opened to the public by 2015.

Cae Ddôl

This is Ruthin's main park area, which includes a children's play area, a lake, walks and picnic area. A skate park was built in 2007 and a zip wire and trim trail added later. The River Clwyd runs through the park.

Listed buildings
According to the historian Peter Smith, "Until the 18th century most towns in Wales had many black-and-white houses (such as Tŷ Nantclwyd y Dre). Ruthin is the only example we have left. It should be carefully conserved, as the last memory we have of these towns." Seven Eyes is a Grade II* listed building of some importance, situated in St Peter's Square.

St Peter's Square
St Peter's Church

St Peter's Church is the parish church of Ruthin. It is in the diocese of St Asaph. Parts are as old as 1282.

The Myddleton Arms
The Myddleton Arms is also known as the Seven Eyes. It is said to have been built in the 14th century. The Dutch style design, long, steeped roof is attributed to Sir Richard Clough, an Elizabethan merchant. It has four tiers of dormer windows, each at a different elevation, known locally as the seven eyes of Ruthin. The property was acquired in 1595 by Sir Hugh Myddleton, who provided London with it first fresh water supply. The view of The Myddleton on the square is in fact of the rear of the building. The front looks out over the Clwydian Hills.

HSBC Bank
Formerly a confectionery and bakery shop rented by Thomas Trehearne, the property was owned by the Castle estate. The property also served as a chemist's shop and later as Dick's boot store. On 1 May 1898, Harris Jones took a lease of the property for 21 years as a draper, hosier, glover and dressmaker; he also sold oilcloths, linoleum and other floor coverings. The shop and house were put up for sale in the 1913 by the castle estate along with the Castle Hotel and the Myddleton Arms, which were purchased by William Owen. His lease expired in 1919 with Jones transferring to what is now Gayla House, where he converted the ground floor from residential to retail premises in 1923. The premises are now owned by the HSBC Bank.

Exmewe House
Formerly the Beehive, this served for 75 years as general drapery and millinery shop. The exact date of the building is not known, but remains of timber framing with wattle and daub indicate that the building is very old. An advertisement claimed the building had been built before 1397. The main section of the building was demolished to make way for the bank. Ruthin Court Rolls refer to a man named Telemann in Ruthin and to a house "in the high St." The rolls record that in 1397, Howell de Rowell passed it on to John Le Sergant. Little is known of the family – possibly a retainer of Edward 1st or Reginald de Grey, probably of Norman French descent. On 24 February, Sergant transferred the tenancy to his daughter Sibilia. The property passed to the Exmewe family by the marriage of Sibilia to Richard Exmewe, their son Thomas being Lord Mayor of London in 1517. Little is known of Exmewe family.

Thomas moved to London, deciding to sell his Ruthin Estate of Exmewe House to a fellow mercer, Edward Goodman. Exmewe House or Nant Clwyd-y-Dre may have been the birthplace of Gabriel Goodman, as the family had connections with both properties.

Details of the next 200 years are unclear. It became the King's Arms in the occupation of John Price. It then became the Queen's Arms (during the reign of Queen Anne, 1702–1714). The property was purchased for £300 on 5 November 1718 by Robert Myddleton of Chirk. The property served as a chemist's through the 19th century until 1913. It was then sold as part of the Castle Estate sales in 1913/1919, for £1275 to Mr Lecomber, who in turn sold it to Barclays Bank, which modernised it to what can be seen today.

The Post Office
Now trading as the Celtic Hair Studio at 2 Well Street. Originally a public house, it was reputedly built in 1401, making it the oldest pub in Ruthin. Lewis Jones, in his 1884 "Handbook For Ruthin and the Vicinity", stated that the old property, formerly the Ruth Inn, had been adapted as a post office some 25 years before. It ceased trading in 1773. In 1850, the building was converted into a drapery, then becoming the town post office again until 1904.

The site of the present post office may have been a medieval Carmelite priory of White Friars, said to have been founded and built by Reginald de Grey and partly destroyed by the Reformation. De Grey also provided a large piece of land close to the castle known as Whitefriars. During the 1860s and 1870s the site housed the Queen's Head public house and a horse-feed chandler; both buildings were destroyed by a 1904 fire; the new post office was built in 1906.

Clwyd Street
Reebees
Located at 33, 35 and 37 Clwyd Street opposite the gaol and now a florist, it was originally the Red Lion public house. In 1824 the hangman, Sam Burrows, was staying at the Red Lion on the night before the execution of John Connor, a highway robber. He gave a detailed demonstration of how he actually hanged a man, unfortunately the stool was accidentally kicked away and Burrows almost hanged himself. The public house ceased trading in 1905.

The Royal Oak
Now flats, the Royal Oak is one of the finest buildings in Ruthin, having three cruck frames, it is a Grade II* listed building.

Porth y Dŵr
At No. 65 Clwyd Street, this Grade II* listed building retains much of the medieval timber frame internally, the oak for which was felled in 1455 and 1456. Its original purpose is unknown, although it has a medieval arched doorway facing towards the 13th-century mill, and a 15th-century solar (private living quarters) with an open roof with cusped windbraces. It is said to have been converted for domestic use in 1586 and occupied by the Moyle family. A two-storey porch with glazed windows (previously described as a balcony) and internal timber panelling was added, possibly in 1655 when further alterations were made. The building was extensively altered in the 19th century, being converted partly into a shop. Porth y Dŵr originally formed a single building with No. 67 Clwyd Street (listed Grade II), and adjoined the medieval west gate to the town, which was demolished in 1786.

Castle Street
All buildings on Castle Street are listed by Cadw. These are the earliest settlements outside the walls of the castle. Some have burgage plots at the back, established by de Grey in 1283. The plots and linear arrangement have barely changed since their foundation.

While there were residential properties at the castle end of the street, commercial properties appeared at the end close to St Peters Square. The one exception was the pub Yr Iwerddon at No. 15. The house retains a name referring to its connection with Irish drovers attending markets and fairs.

Other establishments of interest include No. 1, now Boots, formerly the Raven Inn, which in 1560 may have been the birthplace of Bishop Richard Parry, pupil and master (1584) of Ruthin School. He was involved with Dean Gabriel Goodman and others in translating the Bible and prayer book into Welsh. The main contributor was Bishop William Morgan, but Parry's revision in 1620 became the accepted authorised version. 

The Ruthin Royal Bowling Green used the Raven as their headquarters until the Cornwallis-Wests came to live in Ruthin Castle. The club met at the Raven for its annual and quarterly meetings. When competitions took place, the staff of the Raven would take "cwrw da" (good beer) to the players. With the arrival of the Wests, the bowling green laid out inside the curtilage of the castle forced the club to find an alternative green. The option accepted was the rear of No. 8 Castle Street "Gorphwysfa", then called the Constitutional Club, later renamed the Conservative Club.

No. 2. The Wine Vaults with a six-column Tuscan colonnade were 'known as the Black Horse in the 1820s. This is verified by the Welsh Office survey.
No. 7. Sir John Trevor House served as Totty's the Lawyers in the 1700s, later as an antique shop and tea shop, and finally as a private residence offering bed and breakfast accommodation. Sir John Trevor was Speaker of the House of Commons from 1690 to 1695, when he was dismissed for embezzlement. He was the only Speaker forced to resign, until the forced departure of Michael Martin on 19 May 2009.
"Gorphwysfa" was part of the Castle estate until sold off its owners in 1919. The Rifle Volunteer Corps founded in 1859 stored its armoury at the house until a drill hall was built in Borthyn in 1885. The property became the Conservative Club in November 1885.
No. 9, known as "Corwen", held the offices of Phillips the Attorney. It is now a private residence.
No. 11, Ardwyn, is a private residence on three storeys, formerly the offices of the attorneys Smarts.
No. 12, Plas-yn-Dre, cannot be dated accurately. It was rebuilt in 1823, as recorded by a stone above the front door. It housed the North and South Wales Bank. L. G. Thomas, prime mover in the founding the Presbyterian Church in Wynnstay Road in 1886, was bank manager and lived here.
Nos 16 and 18 are wooden-framed buildings with a 19th-century frontage. They formed part of the Castle estate sales of 1913 and 1919. They probably represent the first use of stucco in Ruthin.

Record Street
The Old County Hall, now Ruthin Library, is a Grade II Listed Building in Record Street, originally named Stryd y Chwain (Welsh for Flea Street) due to its very low standard of living. The inferior housing was demolished to make way for the county court and much grander houses between 1785 and 1788. The present name reflects the storing of records from the assizes and shire hall. In 1860 it became the county court, with a portico added at that time. It served as an assize court and housed its records until the 1970s. The library opened in the early 1990s.

The police station is a Grade II listed building of 1890. Before it was built, the original one was housed in Ruthin Gaol. The new one gave convenient access to the courts. It contains four cells, which are no longer used, and a much reduced number of police officers.

Well Street
Castle Mews, a Grade II listed building is now a shopping precinct. It dates back to the 15th century, with examples of wattle and daub just inside the building on the right hand side. Remodeled in the early 19th century, it became the Cross Keys coaching inn serving the Ruthin to Chester route, with a change of horses in Mold. It later became a temperance commercial hotel and was home to one of the three Ruthin Friendly Societies: groups of male workers of similar background who contributed small amounts on a weekly basis for insurance against injury and old age. At a later date it was the offices of Ruthin Rural District Council.

Nos 10 and 12, a late 18th-century family town house, is Grade II listed. It retained its late Georgian character until converted into today's boutique hotel and art gallery. The cellars are said to have been built of stone from Ruthin Castle. The building has had many uses: as a boarding house for Ruthin School until 1893, a doctors home, a family home, whose most famous resident was Cynthia Lennon, wife of John Lennon while their son Julian attended Ruthin School, a restaurant from the 1930s and a hotel. Today's hotel architecture and art have won several awards.

The Wynnstay Hotel And Wayfarer Wool Shop, two separate buildings, were once connected by an archway, through which coaches and horses entered to the rear of the properties, where there were stables. The present Wayfarers shop is shown in the title deeds as an outbuilding consisting of "an old saddle room, l with a room over and Gentleman's Convenience".

The Wynnstay Hotel, now a private house, is first recorded in 1549 and known for many years as the Cross Foxes, which formed the heraldic arms of the Wynnstay family, which originated from Wrexham. Its members boasted they could travel from Chester to the Llŷn Peninsula without once leaving their own land. It was an important coaching inn for Ruthin to Denbigh travellers and served the Ruthin, Mold and Chester Royal Mail service. The pub in its heyday had a bowling green and tennis courts, and a central porch demolished in 1969.

Plas Coch (also known as the Conservative Club) is a Grade II listed building of medieval origin and a former 17th-century town house. It was rebuilt in 1613 using red sandstone from the castle and became home to the castle Constable. The building has two storeys with attics and four large windows on each floor. In 1963 it became a banqueting hall owned by Rees Jones, who used to trade at the village hall in Llanfair. It became the Conservative Club in 1977, and having been slightly altered, now offers all-round function facilities.

Other areas
The Spread Eagle recalls the coat-of-arms of the Goodwin family. Formerly an inn, records show it traded only from 1792 to 1915, after which it became a temperance hotel, then a retail shop.

Rose Cottage
Rose Cottage is a privately owned residence and a Grade II* listed building on the corner of Rhos Street and Haulfryn. It is listed as an "exceptional survival of a medieval cruck-framed hall-house of relatively low status, retaining its plan-form, character and detail".

Scott House
Situated in the Corwen Road just past Ruthin Castle, Scott House was built 1933 to house the nursing staff of Duff House Sanatorium, which acquired Ruthin Castle and 475 acres (192 ha) of land for their private clinic in April 1923. The Grade II listed building set in landscaped grounds was later divided into flats.

The Town Hall
Ruthin Town Hall is located in Market Street. It was designed by J. W. Poundley and D. Walker in the High Victorian Gothic style and completed in 1865.

Notable people
See :Category:People from Ruthin

 Ida de Grey (1368 in Ruthin Castle – 1426), a Cambro-Norman noblewoman
Sir Thomas Exmewe (ca.1454–1529), Lord Mayor of London 1517–18
Gabriel Goodman (1528–1601), Dean of Westminster, re-founded Ruthin School
Godfrey Goodman (1582/3 – 1656), Anglican Bishop of Gloucester.
Lloyd Kenyon, 1st Baron Kenyon (1732–1802), politician and barrister, went to Ruthin School.
Joseph Ablett (1773–1848), philanthropist, purchased Llanbedr Hall in Llanbedr Dyffryn Clwyd
Dorothea Eliza Smith (1804–1864), a botanical artist noted for painting South American fruit.
Daisy, Princess of Pless (1873 in Ruthin Castle – 1943), society beauty, wife of Prince Hans Heinrich XV von Hochberg 
Wynn Edwards (1842–1900), American farmer and politician
Stanley J. Weyman (1855–1928), English novelist, lived in Ruthin for 33 years and died there.
Sir Henry Haydn Jones MP (1863–1950), politician, slate quarry owner, and owner of the Talyllyn Railway
Władysław Raczkiewicz (1885–1947), the first president of the Polish government in exile, died at Ruthin Castle.
Hafina Clwyd (1936–2011), journalist, town councillor, then mayor of Ruthin (2008–2009)
Cynthia Lennon (1939–2015), first wife of John Lennon, settled in Ruthin. Her son, musician Julian Lennon (born 1963) attended Ruthin School.
Robin Llwyd ab Owain (born 1959), author, poet, and Wikipedian, lives in Ruthin.
Rhys Meirion (born 1966), English National Opera classical tenor; taught near Ruthin
Actors Rhys Ifans (born 1967) and his brother Llŷr Ifans (born 1968) come from Ruthin.
Seren Gibson (born 1988), glamour model, attended Ysgol Brynhyfryd.

Sport 

John Challen (1863–1937), amateur sportsman, played first-class cricket and football
Charles Foweraker (1877–1950), football manager of Bolton Wanderers F.C. from 1919 to 1944
Eric Jones (born 1935), climber, skydiver and BASE jumper.
Doug Dailey MBE (born 1944), racing cyclist 
 Tom Pryce (1949–1977), Formula One racing driver
Eifion Lewis-Roberts (born 1981), rugby union player for Ruthin RFC, lives in Llanbedr Dyffryn Clwyd.
 Rob Higgitt (born 1981), Scarlets rugby union centre, a former resident.
Neil Taylor (born 1989), footballer with 338 club caps and 43 for Wales, attended Ysgol Brynhyfryd.

Geography
Ruthin is situated on the River Clwyd, at the point where it enters the low-lying pastures of the Vale of Clwyd. The Clwydian Range lies to the east and the Clocaenog Forest and Denbigh Moors to the west.

Ruthin is skirted by villages such as Llanbedr Dyffryn Clwyd, Pwllglas and Rhewl.

Twin town
Ruthin is twinned with Brieg, Brittany.

Crime rate
North Wales Police classify Ruthin as having an "average" level of crime for their area, which itself has one of the lowest crime rates in the United Kingdom.

See also
Peers Memorial
Ruthin Town Hall
Castle Hotel
Isaac Clarke (publisher)
The Morning Star, Ruthin
2 & 2A Well Street, Ruthin

References

External links

Town Council site in English
Town Council site in Welsh
Ordnance Survey Geograph - dozens of photos of Ruthin
 

 
Spoken articles
Towns in Denbighshire
County towns in Wales
Wards of Denbighshire